The String Quartet No. 14 in A major, Op. 105, B. 193, was the last string quartet completed by Antonín Dvořák, even though it was published before his String Quartet No. 13 (which appeared with the higher opus number Op. 106).  Dvořák finished his Fourteenth Quartet in 1895, when he had returned to Bohemia after his visit to America. The gestation of the Quartet had actually begun in America and lasted six months, which was rather protracted for the composer.  This Quartet marked an important point in Dvořák's development because he would devote himself almost exclusively to writing explicit program music, namely symphonic poems and operas, afterwards.

The Quartet premiered on October 20, 1896.

Structure

Lasting about 30–35 minutes, the four movements contain the following notable features:

References

External links

 Performance of String Quartet No. 14 by the Borromeo String Quartet from the Isabella Stewart Gardner Museum in MP3 format
1. Adagio ma non troppo – Allegro appassionato
2. Molto vivace
3. Lento e molto cantabile
4. Allegro non tanto

Dvorak 14
1895 compositions
Compositions in A-flat major